Michael Lombardi (born September 2, 1976) is an American actor, producer, and musician. He is best known for his portrayal of the Probationary (Probie) firefighter Mike Silletti in the critically acclaimed hit television show Rescue Me on FX. 
 
Lombardi was a notable alumni of the William Esper Studio, He made his television debut in an episode of Saturday Night Live in 2000. 

Lombardi has appeared in feature films such as the Lionsgate released Last Knights and has acted in TV series such as Blue Bloods (Paramount Global), CSI: Miami (Paramount Global), Castle (The Walt Disney Company) and The Deuce (Warner Bros. Discovery).

Lombardi produced and played the role of Matt  in the Better Noise Films  indie film Sno babies.

Lombardi is also the Producer and plays the lead character John Bishop in the feature film The Retaliators'' which had its European premiere at FrightFest Film Festival  in the UK and opening Screamfest Horror Film Festival in Hollywood CA.

Lombardi won best actor at the Orlando Film Festival. Lombardi is lead singer for the band Apache Stone.

Filmography

References

External links

1976 births
Living people
American male film actors
American male television actors
20th-century American male actors
American film producers
American male musicians
American people of Italian descent